Sir Michael Shaw-Stewart, 6th Baronet (4 October 1788 – 19 December 1836) was a Scottish politician, Member of Parliament for  1827–1830 and  1830–1836.

He was the son of Sir Michael Shaw Stewart, 5th Baronet 1766–1825 (see image below) and the father of Sir Michael Shaw-Stewart, 7th Baronet 1826–1903. He was educated at Christ Church, Oxford, where he befriended Robert Peel, becoming a lifelong political supporter of his.

Whilst the Ardgowan House estate has been owned by the Stewart family since the 15th century, the present house dates from 1797 and remains the seat of the Shaw Stewarts, whose baronetcy of Nova Scotia was conferred by King Charles II on Archibald Stewart of Blackhall in 1667.

Michael Shaw Stewart, who, like so many young gentlemen at the time, took advantage of France's defeat in 1814 to visit the continent. The Treaty of Fontainebleau signed on 11 April 1814 marked the immediate abdication of Napoleon and the end of the embargo on British goods known as the Continental Blockade, suddenly making it much more congenial for the British to visit Europe once more, resurrecting the tradition of The Grand Tour.

Interrupting his career in politics, Shaw Stewart, then aged 27, seized the opportunity to embark on his Grand Tour without hesitation. He carefully recorded his adventures in a diary which, initially intended for his parents, provides contemporary readers with an exceptional insight in the state of Europe so soon after the first defeat of Napoleon. Shaw Stewart travelled to Germany and the Low Countries, France and Italy, where he was particularly attracted to the artistic milieu, visiting the studios of the greatest artists of the time, including those of Canova and later Thordvaldsen, to whom he returned in 1828, once he had inherited the Baronetcy from his father in 1825.

In the early years of the 19th Century Europe's eyes were fixed on Napoleon and his tumultuous rise to power which undoubtedly did not escape Shaw Stewart. So it is not surprising he seized the opportunity afforded by his travels to meet many of Napoleon's family, including his brother Jérôme and his mother, Madame Mère, but never Napoleon himself. In 1814 he was able to purchase the hat worn by the Emperor throughout the 1807 campaign, from the Keeper of the Palace of Dresden. On his second meeting with Madame Mère, in 1816, she presented him with a full-length portrait of Napoleon by Robert Lefèvre. Shaw Stewart continued to make additional purchases throughout his life, such as the wine bottle and lock of mane from Napoleon's favourite charger, by tradition Marengo's. These later acquisitions serving to demonstrate that his fascination did not diminish over time.

Shaw-Stewart married Eliza Mary Farquhar (1799–1851) on 16 September 1819. Farquhar was the daughter of Robert Farquhar, a native of Kintore and Jane Tweedie a native of Antigua of Scottish descent. Farquhar brought to the marriage a large fortune derived from sugar plantations in the Caribbean.  Their marriage produced four sons and four daughters

Family images 
Etching of his father the 5th Baronet by Samuel Cousins after the Sir Henry Raeburn painting:

See also 
 Shaw Stewart baronets

References 

1788 births
1836 deaths
Members of the Parliament of the United Kingdom for Scottish constituencies
Baronets in the Baronetage of Nova Scotia
UK MPs 1826–1830
UK MPs 1830–1831
UK MPs 1831–1832
UK MPs 1832–1835
UK MPs 1835–1837